Manfred Fuchs (25 July 1938 in Latsch, Italy – 26 April 2014 in Kaltern an der Weinstraße) was an Italian-German entrepreneur and space pioneer who was the founder of the German space company OHB.

Life
Fuchs' family owned distilleries in South Tyrol, the brewery forest near Merano, which is still family-owned, also sawmills and wine trade; moreover, his father owned a trucking company and a restaurant. He attended trade school in Bolzano, studied in Munich at the Technical College and from 1957 in Hamburg at the Engineering School. He was a graduate engineer for aerospace engineering and development engineer at Hamburger Flugzeugbau, where he started after graduating in 1959. From 1961 Fuchs worked in Bremen at the aerospace company ERNO, an EADS predecessor. There he was in 1965 a group leader, head of department (Astro Dynamics / Preliminary Development) and department head (Director Department 1982). In 1981, he received full power of attorney. He was involved in the Ariane-1, Columbus and Spacelab projects.

In 1981 he participated with his wife Christa, who initially held the shares, at the Otto Hydraulic Bremen (OHB) in Hemelinger port. OHB was at that time a small company for hydraulic and electrical works with five employees and worked mainly for the Bundeswehr. In 1985 he took over after leaving the ERNO the company OHB completely. Fuchs built the OHB from a company for satellite technology and aviation technology. Initially, the company also produced parts for the Airbus A380. In 2009, the company had about 1,600 employees and is based in Technology Park at the University of Bremen. The company supplied reconnaissance satellites for the German Bundeswehr, including the SAR-Lupe system and satellite data for the Frontex. The turnover amounted to 320 million Euros and then OHB 2009 was the third largest European aerospace group EADS and after the Thales Group. OHB stands since 2000 for high-technology Bremen orbitals. Manfred Fuchs served there as chairman. The company was located in 2009 to 70% in family possession of the Fuchs family, but was listed.

In 2010 the company was awarded the contract for the construction of satellites for the Galileo project, a European GPS system and the contract for the European Meteosat project. The subsidiary MT Aerospace in Augsburg the Fuchs Group is the largest German supplier for the Ariane rocket.

Awards and Tributes 
 1995: Bremer Entrepreneur of the Year
 1996: Honorary Professor of the Bremen University of Applied Sciences
 2005: Honorary Doctor of the Polytechnic University of Milan
 2009: Honorary citizen and supporter of the University of Bremen
 2011: Werner von Siemens Ring
 2014: Manfred Memorial Moon Mission

References

External links 
 Official OHB Website

1938 births
2014 deaths
Businesspeople from South Tyrol
People from Latsch
Werner von Siemens Ring laureates
People in the space industry
German businesspeople in transport
Germanophone Italian people